This is a list of regimes of countries as well as a list of individual leaders around the world which have been described as having created a cult of personality by the media or academia. A cult of personality uses various techniques, including mass media, propaganda, the arts, patriotism, and government-organized demonstrations and rallies to create a heroic image of a leader, often inviting worshipful behavior through uncritical flattery and praise.

Afghanistan 
Nur Muhammad Taraki of the ruling People's Democratic Party of Afghanistan served as President of Afghanistan from 1978 to 1979, when he told people to refer to him with titles such as the "Great Leader" and hung his portrait all across the Democratic Republic of Afghanistan. In the 1990s, Uzbek warlord general Abdul Rashid Dostum, who controlled most of northern Afghanistan, created a similar cult of personality in the region.

Albania
The long time ruler of Communist Albania, Enver Hoxha, had what the OECD called "an overwhelming cult of personality and an ultra-centralized, authoritarian form of decision-making".  Hoxha was widely portrayed as a genius who commented on virtually all facets of life from culture to economics to military matters. Statues of him were erected in cities. Textbooks were required to include quotations of his about their particular subjects. The ruling party of the time, the Party of Labour of Albania, granted him honorific titles such as Supreme Comrade, Sole Force and Great Teacher.  When Hoxha died in 1985, Ramiz Alia took power. Robert D. McFadden of The New York Times wrote that Alia's policies of liberalization were "too little, too late", and the country descended into civil war. Alia served one year in prison for corruption, but the anarchy prevented further charges from being filed against the former Communist regime.

Argentina

Juan Perón, elected three times as President of Argentina, and his second wife, Eva "Evita" Perón, were immensely popular among many of the Argentine people, and to this day they are still considered icons by the leading Justicialist Party. Followers of Perón praised his effort in creating a monolithic labour movement, while their detractors considered him a demagogue and
a dictator that ferociously persecuted dissents and swiftly eroded the republican principles of the country as a way to stay in power. Following his election a personality cult developed around both Perón and Evita.

Azerbaijan

Heydar Aliyev's cult of personality became a significant part of Azerbaijani politics and society after Heydar Aliyev came to power in 1993 and it continued after his death in 2003, when his son Ilham Aliyev succeeded him. Aliyev, a former Soviet politburo member and the leader of Soviet Azerbaijan from 1969 to 1987, became the President of Azerbaijan in 1993. He then began to carefully design an autocratic system, with heavy reliance on family and clan members, oil revenues and patronage.

In Azerbaijan, Heydar Aliyev is presented as the "Father of the Azeri nation", often compared to Mustafa Kemal Atatürk.

Brazil

During the Vargas Era, the Brazilian Department of Information and Propaganda (DIP) promoted a Messiah-style image of Brazilian dictator Getúlio Vargas by broadcasting propaganda every day and by showing him as "saviour of the Brazilian people".

In recent years there has been a growing cult of personality in modern Brazil around the Brazilian president Luiz Inácio Lula da Silva, promoted by the Workers' Party and around Jair Bolsonaro, promoted by right-wing militants.

Cambodia

During its first three years in power, the Khmer Rouge concealed Pol Pot's name and refused to instill a cult of personality around him. Worsening relations with Vietnam forced the Khmer Rouge to instill a cult of personality around Pol Pot so he could be portrayed as a wartime leader who the people could rally around. Plaster images and portraits of him were prepared for public distribution, similar to those of Kim Il-sung and Mao Zedong; however, the Vietnamese invasion cut these plans short, but a less extreme version of Pol Pot's cult of personality continued to exist in the areas which were under the control of Khmer Rouge remnants.

Chile

General Augusto Pinochet, who took power in a military coup in 1973 to 1990, has been affectionally called 'Tata' or grandfather by his supporters and in 1981 was bestowed the honorary military rank of "captain general", a title originally used by the Spanish colonial governors of Chile  In 1989, indigenous Mapuche groups representing the "Consejos Regionales" bestowed Pinochet the title Ulmen Füta Lonko or Great Authority.

China

Republic of China
A personality cult in the Republic of China was centered on the Kuomintang party founder Sun Yat-sen, with his successor, President Wang Jingwei and Generalissimo Chiang Kai-shek. The personality cult of Chiang Kai-shek went further after the republican government fled to Taiwan. He was usually referred to as "Lord Chiang" (蔣公) in public and a space between the characters of his name and title was required in printed materials. Articles in textbooks and songs glorifying him were commonly seen in Taiwan before 1987 – for example, students were required to memorise the Chiang Kai-shek Memorial Song before Lee Teng-hui ascended to the presidency.

People's Republic of China

The People's Republic of China under Chairman Mao Zedong also developed a cult of personality, the most obvious symbol of which is his massive portrait situated on the north end of Tiananmen Square. The culture of the People's Republic of China before 1978 was highly influenced by the personality cult of Mao Zedong which reached its peak during the Cultural Revolution. Mao was referred to as "the great leader Chairman Mao" (伟大领袖毛主席) in public and he was entitled "the great leader, the great supreme commander, the great teacher and the great helmsman" (伟大的领袖、伟大的统帅、伟大的导师、伟大的舵手) in Cultural Revolution. Badges and "little red books" of his quotations were mass-produced. Most people were required to recite the Quotations of Chairman Mao and printed material at that time usually quoted Mao's words in bold as well as in the preface. The Loyalty dance (忠字舞) was also introduced during the Cultural Revolution which lasted from 1966 to 1976.

The cult of personality continued for a  time after Mao's death. His successor Chairman Hua Guofeng also practiced a cult of personality and he was referred to as "the brilliant leader Chairman Hua" (英明领袖华主席). Reforms in 1978 led to a deconstruction of Mao's cult status and the Chinese Communist Party under Deng Xiaoping and his successors such as Jiang Zemin and Hu Jintao were averse to a Mao cult of personality style of rule lest it recreate the chaos of the Cultural Revolution.

The rise and consolidation of power under General Secretary Xi Jinping has given way to a return to Mao-style personality cult centered around General Secretary Xi in state media and propaganda messages, with a political theory bearing his name being enshrined into the Communist Party's constitution in the 19th National Congress in October 2017.

Colombia

Former president Álvaro Uribe became the center of a Cult of Personality in Colombia in the later years of the country's armed conflict. Supporters refer to him as "The Great Colombian" in spite of his family's ties to the Medellín Cartel and the numerous human rights scandals that marred his presidency. In 2013, after Uribe failed to amend the constitution that would allow him to stay in power for a third term in 2010, he founded a political party – the Democratic Center, that uses the former president's silhouette as logo. The party's attempts to be named after its "only leader" were thwarted in 2012.

Cuba
Although one of Fidel Castro's alleged dying wishes was not to have buildings or streets named after him or statues of him erected, in order to avoid a cult of personality, it is generally believed that such a cult had already developed by the time of his death.

A posthumous cult for Che Guevara is also observed in Cuba; statues and murals depicting him are as ubiquitous as Fidel's.

Dominican Republic
Dominican President Rafael Trujillo enjoyed a large cult of personality during his tenure and even after his death. In 1936, the Dominican Congress voted to rename the capital of Santo Domingo to Ciudad Trujillo. The same thing was done with the San Cristóbal Province and Pico Duarte (the country's highest peak), with the latter being rebaptized as "Pico Trujillo". National personalities and politicians alike had praise for Trujillo with license plates that included slogans such as "¡Viva Trujillo!" being massed produced on all levels and put on the rears of cars. Commemorative coins and stamps were created after his presidency with his image on the front.

Egypt
The Egyptian state practiced a Cult of Personality around Gamal Abdel Nasser during his rule. It has been alleged that the Egyptian media has created a personality cult around the current President Abdel Fattah el-Sisi.

Equatorial Guinea
The first president of Equatorial Guinea, Francisco Macías Nguema, was the centre of an extreme personality cult, perhaps fueled by his consumption of copious amounts of bhang and iboga, and he assigned himself titles such as the "Unique Miracle" and "Grand Master of Education, Science, and Culture". The island of Fernando Pó had its name Africanized after him to Masie Ngueme Biyogo Island; upon his overthrow in 1979, its name was again changed to Bioko. The capital, Santa Isabel, had its name changed to Malabo. In 1978, he changed the national motto of the coat of arms of Equatorial Guinea to "There is no other God than Macias Nguema".

This tradition has been continued by Teodoro Obiang Nguema Mbasogo who has been accused of building his own personality cult. As evidence of this, in July 2003, the state-operated radio declared that Obiang was "the country's god" and that he had "all power over men and things."  It added that the president was "in permanent contact with the Almighty" and that he "can decide to kill without anyone calling him to account and without going to hell."  He personally made similar comments in 1993. Macías had also proclaimed himself a god.

Obiang has encouraged his cult of personality by ensuring that public speeches end with well-wishing for himself rather than end with well-wishing for the republic. Many important buildings have a presidential lodge, many towns and cities have streets commemorating Obiang's coup against Macías, and many people wear clothes with his face printed on them.

Like his predecessor and other African dictators such as Idi Amin and Mobutu Sese Seko, Obiang has assigned to himself several creative titles. Among them are "gentleman of the great island of Bioko, Annobón and Río Muni." He also refers to himself as El Jefe (the boss).

France
During World War II, after the defeat of France by Nazi Germany in 1940, the Nazis directly occupied about two-thirds of the country, while the remainder was allowed self-government.  With its capital in Vichy, this new rump country, whose government was conservative and strongly traditionalist with fascistic aspects, became known as Vichy France.  Its president was Marshal Philippe Petain, a hero of the First World War, around whom a cult of personality was built up. A song dedicated to him, "Maréchal, nous voilà !" (lit. "Marshal, Here We Are!") was mandatory for all school children to learn.

In French Indochina, Cambodian schoolchildren in the early 1940s began their school-day with prayers to Marshal Philippe Pétain of Vichy France, opening with the words, "Our father, which art our Leader, glorious be thy name... deliver us from evil", echoing the Lord's Prayer.

Germany

Adolf Hitler, Führer ("leader") of Nazi Germany, was referenced by Nazi propaganda in a number of honorary titles (Supreme Judge of the German People, First Soldier of the German Reich, First Worker of the New Germany, Greatest Military Commander of All Time, Military Leader of Europe, High Protector of the Holy Mountain, etc.). Numerous works in popular music and literature featured Adolf Hitler prominently. Hitler was usually depicted as a heroic, idolatrous figure, loved, feared and respected by the German people.

East Germany's first leader, Walter Ulbricht, was also subjected to a personality cult. People were arrested for mocking Ulbricht's goatee, which was seen by the East German government as a shorthand for him.

Haiti
Dictator François Duvalier fostered a personality cult around himself and he claimed that he was the physical embodiment of the nation. He revived the traditions of vodou, later on exploiting them in order to consolidate his power by claiming that he himself was a houngan, or vodou priest. In an effort to make himself even more imposing, Duvalier deliberately modeled his image on that of Baron Samedi. The most celebrated image from the time shows a standing Jesus Christ with a hand on a seated Papa Doc's shoulder with the caption "I have chosen him".  In 1986, the Haitian constitution outlawed Duvalier-type personality cults.

Hungary
Hungarian Communist leader Mátyás Rákosi was surrounded by a cult of personality similar to that of Stalin. This peaked on his 60th birthday in 1952, which was commemorated with a series of nationwide celebrations. Many things were named after him, including:
 the Manfréd Weiss Steel and Metal Works
 the University of Miskolc
 a village founded in 1952 (Mátyásdomb, i.e. Mátyás-Hill)
 Rákosi scholarship for college and university students
 National Rákosi Competition (for high school students, today: Országos Középiskolai Tanulmányi Verseny)
 Rákosi Medal for winners of the above-mentioned competition

After de-Stalinization, his name was dropped from all institutions in 1956.

India
India's first prime minister Jawaharlal Nehru was known to foster a personality cult around himself. Many leaders opposed Nehru's style of functioning, his economic policies and his socialist agenda. C Rajagopalachari criticized the personality cult surrounding Nehru, saying that there should be an opposition group within the Congress because it was running with "accelerators and no brakes" without a true opposition. Rajagopalachari later formed the liberal Swatantra Party because of his opposition to Nehru's style of functioning. The expression 'Nehruvian consensus' reflects the dominance of Nehruvian ideals, a product of Nehru's personality cult and the associated statism, i.e. the overarching faith in the state and the leadership. The Congress party has been accused of propagating a personality cult centred around Nehru, his daughter Indira Gandhi & the Nehru-Gandhi family.

Current Indian Prime Minister Narendra Modi is often criticised for creating a personality cult around him. Many of the leaders and supporters of Modi's political party Bharatiya Janata Party (BJP) often praised him and tried to build a god-like persona over him. Shivraj Singh Chouhan, the chief minister of the country's second largest state, said in 2022, "He is superhuman and has traces of god in him." It is observed by media critics that despite bad governance and several political setbacks, Modi's charisma and popularity was a key factor that helped the BJP return to power in the 2019 Parliament elections. Opposition and critics often accused Modi for spreading propaganda using popular media such as movies, television and web series,. Modi is often accused of having narcissist traits. In 2015, Modi wore a suit which has his name on it.

Indonesia

There were extensive cults of personality surrounding Indonesia's first two presidents, Sukarno and Suharto.

During the Guided Democracy era, Sukarno developed a cult of personality.  He was made "president for life" by the MPRS in 1963. His ideological writings on the 1959 Political Manifesto (Manipol-USDEK) and NASAKOM ("Nationalism, Religion and Communism") became mandatory subjects in Indonesian schools and universities, while his speeches were to be memorized and discussed by all students. All newspapers, the only radio station (RRI, government-run), and the only television station (TVRI, also government-run) were made into "tools of the revolution" and functioned to spread Sukarno's messages. Sukarno's cult extends to the capital of newly acquired West Irian renamed to Sukarnopura and the highest peak in the country was renamed from Carstensz Pyramid to Puntjak Sukarno (Sukarno Peak). The 1962 Asian Games Sports Complex was also renamed after him, as he was also the architect involved. He was featured in the obverse of some of the banknotes issued during his time in office.

Sukarno was popularly referred to as bung ("comrade"), and he painted himself as a man of the people who carried the aspirations of Indonesia and dared to take on the West. Also, some other titles were given to him, like "Great Leader of the Revolution". When General Suharto gradually rose to power on 11 March 1966, Sukarno's cult, roles, and services were eradicated in a de-Sukarnoization policy.

The New Order government created a propaganda in which Suharto is depicted as the "hero" during the 1949 General Offensive, as well as during the 30 September coup attempt and its subsequent mass killings and unrests. He was also granted the title of bapak pembangunan ("father of development") in 1983. Several books praising him and his works were published during his 30 years of power, such as the 6-book series of "Jejak Langkah Pak Harto" (Mr. Harto's Footsteps) by Nazaruddin Sjamsuddin (1991), "The Smiling General: President Soeharto of Indonesia" by an unknown German named Otto Gustav Roeder (1969) – who was thought to be a former Schutzstaffel member and spy stationed in Indonesia named  – and his autobiography entitled "Pikiran, Ucapan, dan Tindakan Saya" (My Thoughts, Remarks, and Actions, 1989).

In 1993, its central bank, Bank Indonesia, issued the first – and the then-highest valued – banknote of 50,000 rupiah. Its obverse pictured Suharto as the Father of Development and the slogan "25 Tahun Indonesia Membangun" (25 years of Indonesia's development), which dated back to his first term as president in 1968.

In September 1998, four months after the Suharto's resignation, Information Minister Yunus Yosfiah – who was formerly his closest ally – declared that the Treachery of G30S/PKI film would no longer be compulsory viewing material, reasoning that it was an attempt to manipulate history and create a cult within Suharto as the protagonist. In addition, the aforementioned sports complex name was restored in 2001.

In the present day, Suharto is still venerated and revered among the country's older demographic and conservative politicians. Furthermore, there were demands by some citizens and politicians to re-establish his policies as part of the "New Order revivalism", whom many considers beneficial.

Iran

Following the Iranian Revolution, a cult of personality developed around Supreme Leaders Ruhollah Khomeini and Ali Khamenei. This is most evident in the ubiquitous visual depictions of both men. According to Baqer Moin, as part of Khomeini's personality cult, he "had been transformed into a semi-divine figure. He was no longer a grand ayatollah and deputy of the Imam, one who represents the Hidden Imam, but simply 'The Imam'." Khomeini's personality cult fills a central position in foreign- and domestically targeted Iranian publications. The methods used to create his personality cult have been compared to those used by such figures as Joseph Stalin, Mao Zedong and Fidel Castro, and it was encouraged by Khomeini himself (which was negatively noted by his enemies inside Iran). Regarding Khamenei, Amir Taheri has written, "Like Khomeini before him, Khamenei is the object of a massive cult of personality. Official flatterers describe him as a "Divine Gift to Mankind" or as the "Shining Sun of the Imamate." In official discourse, he is quoted more often than either Prophet Muhammad or the Koran itself. Objects which he has touched during provincial visits are collected and sold as icons..."

The People's Mujahedin of Iran has also built a cult of personality around its leaders Massoud and Maryam Rajavi.

There is a personality cult built around Qasem Soleimani, ever since his death.

Iraq
As a sign of his consolidation of power as Iraq's dictator, Saddam Hussein's personality cult pervaded Iraqi society. He had thousands of portraits, posters, statues and murals erected in his honor all over Iraq. His face could be seen on the sides of office buildings, schools and classrooms, airports, and shops, as well as on all denominations of Iraqi currency (the dinar). Saddam's personality cult reflected his efforts to appeal to the various elements in Iraqi society. This was seen in his variety of apparel: he appeared in the costumes of the Bedouin, the traditional clothes of the Iraqi peasant (which he essentially wore during his childhood), and even appeared in Kurdish clothing, but he also appeared in Western suits fitted by his favorite tailor, projecting the image of an urbane and modern leader. Sometimes he would also be portrayed as a devout Muslim, wearing a full headdress and robe, praying towards Mecca, but most often he was depicted wearing a military uniform.

An international airport, a university, a bridge, a dam, a stadium, an art centre, a street, an urban district (Saddam-city), a rocket and other objects were named after him. Saddam even had many well-decorated (by golden flush toilets) palaces for his own private use. People brought many gifts to Saddam that were collected in a special palace. According to his order, every tenth brick of reconstructed ancient buildings (including Nebuchadnezzar's palace) was marked with his name or signature. His biography and his literary works were required reading in schools and Ba'ath Party functioneers examined students' knowledge of them. Many written songs, novels, scientific and propaganda articles were devoted to him. State television was broadcast with his image in the background and a mosque at the corner of the screen and it very often showed him, or his hands being kissed by children and other people.

After the fall of his regime, made visible by the toppling of his statue on Firdous Square in Baghdad on April 9, 2003, all statues of Saddam were destroyed. All other aspects of his cult were dismantled as well.

Italy

The personality cult of Benito Mussolini was in many respects the unifying force of the Fascist regime, acting as a common denominator for various political groups and social classes in both the fascist party and the wider Italian society. A basic slogan proclaimed that Mussolini was always right. Endless publicity revolved around him. He was generally portrayed in a macho manner, although he could also appear as a Renaissance man, a military man, a family man, or even as a common man. This reflected his presentation as a universal man, expert in all subjects; a light was left on his office long after he was asleep as a part of fascist propaganda in order to present him as an insomniac owing to his driven to work nature. Mussolini himself oversaw which photographs could appear, rejecting some, for instance, because he was not sufficiently prominent in a group. Legends of Mussolini defying death during the First World War and surviving assassination attempts were circulated in order to give the dictator a mythical, immortal aura. In addition to depicting Mussolini as being chosen by God, the regime presented him as having omnipotent, godlike or superhuman powers. His image proclaimed that he had improved the Italian people morally, materially, and spiritually. Even before his seizure of power, he was proclaimed the Duce in song. The war on Ethiopia was presented as a revival of the Roman Empire, with Mussolini as Augustus.

With the entry of media tycoon Silvio Berlusconi into Italian politics in the 2000s, some critics claimed that a new kind of cult of personality was in place, favored by Berlusconi's three national television networks and newspapers. Moreover, the hymn of Berlusconi's movements Forza Italia and People of Freedom was Meno male che Silvio c'è, literally "Thank goodness for Silvio". In addition to that, Berlusconi often described himself as the Jesus Christ of Italian politics. These attitudes were seen by public opinion as clear examples of the new political style that Berlusconi brought into Italy, focused on the leader's charisma, cult of personality and media domination. Silvio Berlusconi was Prime Minister of Italy for three terms and four governments. He governed the country for a total of almost ten years (less than one year in 1994–1995; five years in 2001–2006; and three and a half years in 2008–2011).

Kazakhstan
The former first President Nursultan Nazarbayev is the subject of a state sponsored personality cult in Kazakhstan, where he has assumed the title "Leader of the Nation". After the president's resignation, the Parliament of Kazakhstan has voted to renamed their capital, Astana, into Nur-sultan as a 'tribute'.

Korea

Republic of Korea

After taking power in a coup in 1961, President Park Chung-hee developed a personality cult of a type very similar to his North Korean counterpart, with his image on posters and paintings that were displayed dynamically at marches and stadium gatherings. Many of the themes of Park Chung-hee's propaganda were very similar to those of North Korea, for example, being seen planting trees in a planting ceremony.

Democratic People's Republic of Korea

The peer-reviewed academic journal North Korean Review, published by the Institute for North Korean Studies at the University of Detroit Mercy in Detroit, Michigan, United States, reports that "Like his father Kim Jong-il during his lifetime, Kim Jong-un has so far avoided a cult of personality around himself that would include statues, street and place names, or images in pins or in apartments. He inherited, however, a few titles such as 'Great Sun of the 21st century,' 'Marshal,' or his father's title 'Great Leader' [widaehan ryŏngdoja]. The other 'Great Leader' [widaehan suryŏng] is still exclusively used for Kim Il-sung."

Laos
A cult of personality is centered around the founders of the Lao People's Democratic Republic, Kaysone Phomvihane and the less prominent Prince Souphanouvong since their deaths in the early 1990s as there were no personality cults bestowed to them during their time in power. Kaysone's portrait is displayed on public government buildings as well as on Laotian Kip bills. There is a museum built in Vientiane in order to honor Kaysone's life. Statues are also erected in his honor. Souphanouvong's name and face are also seen in memorials, museums, and statues all across Laos, with a university being named after him in Luang Prabang. Due to Souphanouvong's past position as only a figurehead president and leader of the communist Pathet Lao movement with Kaysone holding the real power over Laos, the display of Souphanouvong's personality cult are seen with much lesser prominence than Kaysone.

Libya
A cult of personality devoted to Colonel Muammar Gaddafi existed in Libya during his rule. His face appeared on a wide variety of items, including postage stamps, watches, and school satchels. Quotations from The Green Book appeared on a wide variety of places, from street walls to airports and even on pens, and they were also put to pop music for public release.

Gaddafi claimed that he disliked the personality cult surrounding him, but he tolerated it because the Libyan people adored him. Biographers Blundy and Lycett believed that he was "a populist at heart". Throughout Libya, crowds of supporters would turn up to public events at which he appeared; described as "spontaneous demonstrations" by the government, there are recorded instances of groups being coerced or paid to attend.

He was typically late to public events, and he would sometimes not show up at all. Although Bianco thought that he had a "gift for oratory", he was considered a poor orator by biographers Blundy and Lycett. Biographer Daniel Kawczynski noted that Gaddafi was famous for his "lengthy, wandering" speeches, which typically involved criticizing Israel and the U.S.

Philippines

In the Philippines, many local politicians engage in some sort of cult of personality. The most famous are those of President Ferdinand Marcos, who was dictator from 1972 to 1986 and the Aquino family. They are often branded as "epalitiko" by the media, which is a contraction of the words epal (slang for "attention-grabber"), and pulítiko ("politician"). They put their images and their names on billboards of government projects. They also print tarpaulins, usually with their images in order to establish a sense of connection with their constituents. Senate Bill No. 1967 or Anti-Signage of Public Works Act, colloquially known as the Anti-Epal Bill, was filed by Senator Miriam Defensor Santiago in November 2011, and refiled again in July 2013 in an effort to stop the practice.

The 16th president, Rodrigo Duterte, is accused of creating a cult of personality on himself, with some supporters believing "he was appointed by God".

Poland

A cult of personality developed in Poland around the figure of Józef Piłsudski, a Polish military commander and politician, starting from the interwar period and continuing after his death in 1935 until the present day. During the interwar period, Piłsudski's personality cult was propagated by the state media, which described him as a masterful strategist and a political visionary, and associated him with his role in regaining Polish independence in the aftermath of World War I, and his leadership in the ensuing Polish–Soviet War. It has survived decades of repression, particularly during the era of communist rule.

In modern Poland, Piłsudski is recognized as an important and largely positive figure in Polish history. Polish Independence Day is commemorated on November 11, the date when Piłsudski assumed power in Poland after the First World War. Piłsudski's successor Edward Śmigły-Rydz began to develop his own cult of the individual.

Pope John Paul II is also the namesake of numerous statues, museums, streets, universities, etc. while at least one reporter was prosecuted for offending his persona in print.

Portugal

During the Estado Novo regime, but mainly at its beginning, there was a significant effort by the state to promote António de Oliveira Salazar as a national hero who saved the country from political and financial instability, with him often getting compared to other historical figures of Portugal. Sometimes called "chefe" (chief), propaganda posters and photographs glorifying not only Salazar but also Óscar Carmona were commonly placed in public buildings such as schools and police stations. In schools, it was also common for books to have direct references to Salazar and his status as protector and savior of the nation, such as the famous "A Lição de Salazar" (The Lesson of Salazar), printed and distributed in Portuguese schools in 1938 with the purpose of promoting the values of the National Union party and the work carried out by Salazar up to that point. The government also used cinema (which was at that time a relatively new and growing phenomenon in Portugal) to further glorify Salazar but also to spread anti-communist indoctrination and the apology of corporatism, thus causing cinematographic propaganda to be spread throughout the country on classic Portuguese films such as "O Pátio das Cantigas" (The Courtyard of Songs).

Some infrastructures inaugurated or restructured during the regime were named or renamed after the dictator, such as the 25 de Abril Bridge (formerly called Salazar Bridge, not to be confused with the Salazar Bridge built in 1935 in Santa Comba Dão) and the Josina Machel Secondary School (formerly called Salazar National Liceu), the latter also having a statue of the dictator at its main entrance. The Portuguese coin of 20 escudos had represented in itself the Salazar Bridge and Óscar Carmona had several stamps and angolar currency notes printed with his image in circulation in Angola.

Romania

In 1986 The New York Times reporter, David Binder stated that Romanian dictator Nicolae Ceaușescu presided over "a cult of personality that has equaled, or even surpassed, those of Stalin's Russia, Mao's China and Tito's Yugoslavia." Inspired by the personality cult surrounding Kim Il-sung in North Korea, it started with the 1971 July Theses which reversed the liberalization of the 1960s and imposed a strict nationalist ideology. Initially, the cult of personality was only focused on Ceaușescu himself; however, by the early 1980s, his wife Elena was also a focus of the cult even to the extent that she got credit for scientific achievements which she could never have accomplished. It remained in force until the overthrow of the regime in 1989 and the couple's execution.

Another Romanian communist ruler, Gheorghe Gheorghiu-Dej, and a King of Romania, Carol II, also had a cult of personality during their rule.

Russia

Tsarist and Soviet era

Since the Russian Empire era, Russia has a very long history of personality cults among the country's leaders, as the Tsars were glorified as wise and gracious leaders, some historians take the line that the succeeding Soviet Union adapted this tradition. Under Joseph Stalin, the Soviet state fostered an extreme cult of personality around him, which was known as Stalinism.

Nikita Khrushchev recalled Karl Marx's criticism in his 1956 "Secret Speech" denouncing Joseph Stalin and his cult of personality to the 20th Party Congress:

Some authors (e.g., Alexander Zinovyev) have argued that Leonid Brezhnev's rule was also characterized by a cult of personality, though unlike Stalin, Brezhnev did not initiate large-scale persecutions in the country. One of the aspects of Leonid Brezhnev's cult of personality was his obsession with titles, rewards and decorations, leading to his inflated decoration with medals, orders and so on. This was often ridiculed by the ordinary people and led to the creation of many political jokes.

Modern Russia

Some journalists and Russian oppositionists argue that there is now a cult of personality around Vladimir Putin. As of 2011, one-fourth of the Russian population believes that a cult of personality reminiscent of Soviet Union-era leaders has developed around Putin, while another thirty percent believed that there were increasing signs of a personality cult surrounding Putin. Evidence of this includes food products named after him. Other evidence of  includes the existence of the Army of Putin, his own female fan club  as well as his involvement in action man publicity stunts. According to the United States Government-funded Radio Free Europe, in December 2015, a Russian youth group by the name of "Network" published a book titled "World-Changing Words: Key quotes of Vladimir Putin", which has been compared to Mao Zedong's Little Red Book.

The Head of the Chechen Republic, Ramzan Kadyrov has also been likened to possessing an extensive cult of personality. According to The New Yorker columnist Joshua Yaffa, media in Chechnya supplies heavy coverage to their leader, including "plenty of stories of citizens appealing to Kadyrov through messages on Instagram, and in many cases Kadyrov himself would show up the next day to fix some small problem or cajole an incompetent official into action." Kadyrov's father Akhmad has also been subject to lavish attention, and in 2021 his book A Path Bathed in Light was made required reading for Chechen highschoolers. Ramzan ordered dozens of images of superheroes in 2020 to be removed, on the grounds that "there are many real heroes from whom you can and should take an example, otherwise children think that only these heroes exist," and had them replaced with pictures of his father. Then-Chechen President Alu Alkhanov criticized Kadyrov in 2007 for growing a personality cult. Kadyrov denied all such allegations in an interview with Radio Free Europe/Radio Liberty.

Serbia

Some observers have described that Aleksandar Vučić built a cult of personality during his authoritarian rule as prime minister and as president. After Vučić's inauguration as the president of Serbia, he appointed Ana Brnabić as his successor as prime minister. Shortly afterwards, Brnabić suggested that the portraits of the president Vućić be placed in all state institutions “to strengthen the cult of the state”, which was supported by some ministers. According to investigative journalism portal Crime and Corruption Reporting Network, more than 700 fake news were published on the front pages of pro-government tabloids during 2018. Many of them were about alleged attacks on the Vučić and attempts of coups, as well as messages of support to him by Vladimir Putin. In 2020, Twitter announced that they shut down the network of 8,500 spam accounts that wrote 43 million tweets – acted in concert to cheerlead for president Vučić and his party, boost Vučić-aligned content and attack his opponents. Some athletes and sports officials praised Vučić for own success, even giving him their own medals.

In the last days of the campaign before the 2017 presidential election, he was a guest with his parents on the TV show on Happy TV, in which he offered assistance in front of the camera to a man who allegedly fainted. Parliamentary leader of governing Serbian Progressive Party, Zoran Babić, declared during the session that he admires the Vučić physically and mentally, stating that he was impressed that Vučić had not left the hall for hours to go to the toilet. Director of the Institute for Health Protection of Mother and Child of Serbia stated that the children patients and parents were more smiling and cheerful than ever because of the president's visit. After Vučić was hospitalized for cardiovascular problems in November 2019, ministers, party colleagues and local party committees wrote announcements and organized support groups, while his associates and pro-regime media accused the journalists of worsening the president's health by asking “inappropriate” questions about alleged corruption by government ministers.

Spain

A cult of personality surrounded Francisco Franco during his regime. From the mid-1940s onward, after he proclaimed Spain a monarchy with himself as regent for life, he was depicted much like a king. He wore the uniform of a captain general (a rank traditionally reserved for the king) and resided in the royal Pardo Palace. He appropriated the kingly privilege of walking beneath a canopy, and his portrait appeared on most Spanish coins. Indeed, although his formal titles were Jefe del Estado (Head of State) and Generalísimo de los Ejércitos Españoles (Generalissimo of the Spanish Armed Forces), he was referred to as Caudillo de España por la gracia de Dios, (By the Grace of God, the Leader of Spain). Por la Gracia de Dios is a technical, legal formulation which states sovereign dignity in absolute monarchies, and it had only been used by monarchs before Franco used it himself.

For almost four decades, schoolchildren were taught that Franco had been sent by Divine Providence to save Spain from chaos, atheism and poverty.

Sri Lanka
Mahinda Rajapaksa has been accused of creating a cult of personality around himself, using the civil war victory and Sinhala chauvinism. He was referred as a "King" by some of his supporters, and he used the media to portray himself as a strong man. During his time in power, his pictures were shown on buses, billboards, and all forms of media. Television ads where songs were sung by school children in his rallies would hail him as "our father" and "father of the country". Rajapaksa also printed his picture on currency and named the budget airline Mihin Lanka after himself. Rajapaksa thought having his name in the sky would bring him good fortune. By 2022 the popularity of the Rajapaksas had declined and during the 2022 Sri Lankan Protests protesters named him "Myna" as an insulting nickname and demanded his resignation alongside the entire Rajapaksa family.

Mattala Rajapaksa International Airport, Magampura Mahinda Rajapaksa Port, Nelum Pokuna Mahinda Rajapaksa Theatre, and Mahinda Rajapaksa International Stadium were all high-profile lavish infrastructure projects initiated by Rajapaksa during his administration and named for him. Thus, critics have accused Rajapaksa of being narcissistic.

Syria

As one of his strategies to maintain power over Syria, Hafez al-Assad developed a state-sponsored cult of personality. Portraits of him, often depicting him engaging in heroic activities, were placed in every public space. He named myriad numbers of places and institutions in Syria after himself and other members of his family, such as Lake Assad, an artificial reservoir filled during his time in office. In school, children were taught to sing songs of adulation for Assad. Teachers would begin each school day with the slogan "Our eternal leader, Hafez al-Assad". The personality cult that he developed portrayed him as a wise, modest and just leader of the country. This strategy of creating a cult of personality was continued by Hafez's son and the current Syrian president, Bashar al-Assad.

Thailand

All members of Thailand's royal family, past and present, are officially venerated in a personality cult, especially beginning with King Bhumibol Adulyadej's ascension to the throne. Huge portraits of Bhumibol and his son and successor King Maha Vajiralongkorn, and other members of the royal family are disseminated throughout the country. The royal family is protected by lèse-majesté laws which allow critics to be jailed for three to fifteen years.

Togo
President of the Togolese Republic Gnassingbé Eyadéma had a personality cult of titanic proportions, including, but not limited to, an entourage of one thousand dancing women who sang and danced in praise of him; schoolchildren beginning their day by singing his praises; portraits which adorned most stores; a bronze statue in the capital city, Lomé; $20 wristwatches with his portrait, which disappeared and re-appeared every fifteen seconds; and even a comic book that depicted him as a superhero and budai with powers of invulnerability and superhuman strength. In addition, the date of a failed attempt on Eyadéma's life was annually commemorated as "the Feast of Victory Over Forces of Evil."  Eyadéma even changed his first name from Étienne to Gnassingbé to note the date of the 1974 plane crash of which he was claimed to be the only survivor. A 2018 study found that "Gnassingbé Eyadema's rule rested on repression, patronage, and a bizarre leadership cult."

Turkey

In Turkey, founder of the Turkish Republic Mustafa Kemal Atatürk is commemorated by a myriad of memorials throughout the country, such as the Atatürk International Airport in Istanbul, the Atatürk Bridge over the Golden Horn (Haliç), the Atatürk Dam, and Atatürk Stadium. His titles include Great Leader (Ulu Önder),  Eternal Commander (Ebedî Başkomutan), Head Teacher (Başöğretmen), and Eternal Chief (Ebedî Şef). Atatürk statues have been erected in all Turkish cities by the Turkish Government, and most towns have their own memorial to him. His face and name are seen and heard everywhere in Turkey; his portrait can be seen in all public buildings, in all schools and classrooms, on all school textbooks, on all Turkish lira banknotes, and in the homes of many Turkish families.

At the exact time of Atatürk's death, on every 10 November, at 09:05, most vehicles and people in the country's streets pause for one minute in remembrance. In 1951, the Turkish Parliament issued a law (5816) outlawing insults to his reminiscence or destruction of objects representing him, which is still in force. A government website was created to denounce the websites that violate this law, and the Turkish government as of 2011 has filters in place to block websites deemed to contain materials insulting to his memory.

The start of Atatürk's cult of personality is placed in the 1920s when the first statues started being built. The idea of Atatürk as the "father of the Turks" is ingrained in Turkish politics and politicians in that country are evaluated in relation to his cult of personality. The persistence of the phenomenon of Atatürk's personality cult has become an area of deep interest to scholars.

Atatürk impersonators are also seen around Turkey much after Atatürk's death to preserve what is called the "world's longest-running personality cult".

Ottoman sultans Mehmed the Conqueror and Abdul Hamid II have cults of personality created by religious conservatives and Islamists. They associate the policies of these statesmen with their "piety".

In recent years there has been a growing cult of personality in modern Turkey around current President of Turkey Recep Tayyip Erdoğan.

The cults created for the sultans and Erdoğan are kept alive by devout Muslims who oppose secular lifestyle and secularist ideas.

Turkmenistan

Saparmurat Niyazov, who was President of Turkmenistan from 1985 to 2006, is another oft-cited cultivator of a cult of personality. Niyazov simultaneously cut funding to and partially disassembled the education system in the name of "reform", while injecting ideological indoctrination into it by requiring all schools to use his own book, the Ruhnama, as their primary text, and like Kim Il-sung, there is even a creation myth surrounding him. During Niyazov's presidency there was no freedom of the press nor was there freedom of speech. This further meant that opposition to Niyazov was strictly forbidden and major opposition figures have been imprisoned, institutionalized, deported, or they have fled the country, and their family members are routinely harassed by the authorities. Additionally, a silhouette of Niyazov was used as a logo on television broadcasts, Krasnovodsk town was renamed "Turkmenbashi" after him, and schools, airports and even a meteorite are also named after him and members of his family. Statues and pictures of him were also "erected everywhere". For these, and other reasons, the US government said that by the time he died, "Niyazov's personality cult … had reached the dimensions of a state-imposed religion."

Human Rights Watch, in its World Report 2012, says there is a cult of personality of President Gurbanguly Berdimuhamedow and that it is strengthening. Agence France-Presse reports a developing personality cult. Reporters Without Borders says the president is promoting a cult of personality around himself and that his portraits have taken the place of the ones of the previous president.

Tunisia

Habib Bourguiba, the first leader and president of the Republic of Tunisia, represents a great culte of personality in the history of the modern Tunisia. A adovcate formed in France in the 1920s, he returned to Tunisia to campaign in nationalist circles. In 1934, at the age of 31, he founded the Neo-Destour, spearhead of the movement for the independence of Tunisia. Several times arrested and exiled by the authorities of the French protectorate, he chose to negotiate with the Fourth Republic, while putting pressure on it, to achieve his goal. Once independence was obtained on March 20, 1956, he helped put an end to the monarchy and proclaim the Republic, of which he took over as first president on July 25, 1957.

From then on, he worked to set up a modern state. Among the priorities of its political action are the development of education, the reduction of inequalities between men and women, economic development and a balanced foreign policy, which makes it an exception among the arab leaders.

Almost all the cities of Tunisia have a street or avenue bearing the name of Bourguiba since the independence of the country. The most famous of them is Avenue Habib Bourguiba located in Tunis. In 1965, it is even, during a trip to ten African countries, that an avenue bears his name in each of the capitals crossed.

United States

A number of presidents in American history have been noted by various historians as being supported by the effects of a cult of personality, among them George Washington, Thomas Jefferson, Andrew Jackson, Theodore Roosevelt, Franklin D. Roosevelt, Ronald Reagan, and Donald Trump. However, Conrad Black, who penned, among others, several biographies of American presidents, argued that "supreme champion of the American personality cult" has "deservedly" been Abraham Lincoln. John F. Kennedy's cult of personality largely came about after his assassination, although his and his wife Jackie Kennedy's appearance all contributed to the aura of "Camelot" which surrounded his administration.
Another American politician to whom a cult of personality has been ascribed is Huey Long, the populist governor of Louisiana from 1928 to 1932, who continued to control the politics of the state as a United States senator until he was assassinated in 1935.

Numerous commentators have referred to a personality cult which has been built up around Donald Trump by members of Republican Party and other supporters of his "Make America Great Again" (MAGA) program.

United Kingdom

The nature of the Westminster System used in the United Kingdom tends to create assertive figures that are revered in their party. Prime Ministers such as Winston Churchill and Margaret Thatcher sometimes develop a cult of personality due to their long tenure or their leadership through crisis. Populist politicians, including former UKIP and Reform UK leader Nigel Farage, former Opposition Leader and Labour Party Leader Jeremy Corbyn, and Scottish First Minister and SNP leader Nicola Sturgeon, also enjoy large, cult-like backing from supporters of Brexit, Corbynmania, and Scottish Independence respectively.

Venezuela

In Venezuela, a cult of personality has been created around the late President Hugo Chávez, in which his supporters venerate him. Chávez largely received his support through his charisma and by spending Venezuela's oil funds on the poor. Since his death, his followers, known as "Chavistas" refer to his death as a "transition to immortality", commonly calling Chávez the "eternal commander". Among his followers, Chávez has been compared to holy figures, especially by his successor Nicolás Maduro.

According to Tomás Straka of Andres Bello University, Chávez's cult of personality began following the 1992 Venezuelan coup d'état attempts which Chávez led, with Straka explaining that some Venezuelans "saw no solution to their most fundamental problems and they saw in Chávez a savior, or an avenger of those groups that had no hope". Since the beginning of Chávez's tenure in 1999, the Venezuelan government manipulated the Venezuelan public with social programs depicting him as a great leader for the people. The struggles that Chávez endured throughout his presidency, such as the 2002 Venezuelan coup d'état attempt, also drew compassion from his followers which boosted his support. By the time of Chávez's death, speculation about potential Chavista reactions to his death were compared to the sorrow felt by those in North Korea who mourned the death of Kim Jong-il, with one scholar of Latin America from the University of California Santa Barbara, Juan Pablo Lupi, stating that the creation of Chávez's cult of personality was "very well-staged, all this process of myth-making and appealing to the feelings and religious sentiment of the people. This is something that is quasi-religious". The creation of Chávez's cult of personality was a
strategy used by his government to maintain legitimacy before and after his death.

Vietnam

The Vietnamese Communist Party regime has continually maintained a personality cult around Ho Chi Minh since the 1950s in North Vietnam, and it was later extended to South Vietnam after reunification, which it sees as a crucial part of its propaganda campaign surrounding Ho and the Party's past. Ho Chi Minh is frequently glorified in schools by schoolchildren. Opinions, publications and broadcasts that are critical of Ho Chi Minh or that identify his flaws are banned in Vietnam, and the commentators are arrested or fined for "opposing the people's revolution". Ho Chi Minh is even glorified to a religious status as an "immortal saint" by the Vietnamese Communist Party, and some people "worship the President", according to a BBC report.

The former capital of South Vietnam, Saigon, was officially renamed Ho Chi Minh City on 1 May 1975, one day after its capture, which officially ended the Vietnam War.

Yugoslavia

Josip Broz Tito (in power from 1945 until 1980) developed a cult of personality around himself. His cult has been described as a combination of a "peasant chief, protector and the legendary hero". During his lifetime, his cult of personality included, among other things, naming places after him (including four cities), celebrations of his birthday (including Relay of Youth), widespread use of his portraits, writing his name in landscapes, so they could be seen from the air, etc.

Zaire
Mobutu Sese Seko used his cult of personality to create a god-like public image of himself in Zaire, which today is the Democratic Republic of the Congo. Mobutu created a totalitarian state, amassed massive wealth for himself and presided over the economic deterioration of his country and human rights abuses.

He used mass media communications to entrench his rule.

Mobutu embarked on a campaign of pro-African cultural awareness and in 1972, he formally changed his name to Mobutu Sese Seko Nkuku Ngbendu Wa Za Banga ("The all-powerful warrior who, because of his endurance and inflexible will to win, goes from conquest to conquest, leaving fire in his wake.")

References
Notes

Further reading
 Hufbauer, Benjamin (2006) Presidential Temples: How Memorials and Libraries Shape Public Memory. Lawrence, Kansas: University Press of Kansas. 
 Burckel, Nicholas (April 2007) "Presidential Temples: How Memorials and Libraries Shape Public Memory (review)"  Portal: Libraries and the Academy v. 7, n. 2, pp. 250–252.

Cults of personality